This article lists successful and failed coups d'état that have taken place in the Comoros since 1975:

1970s 
 3 August 1975: President Ahmed Abdallah was overthrown by Said Mohamed Jaffar and French mercenary Bob Denard.
 13 May 1978: President Ali Soilih was overthrown by Ahmed Abdallah and Bob Denard, resulting in his killing thirteen days later; Denard became the commander of Abdallah's 500-strong Presidential Guard for the next eleven years (1978–1989).

1980s 
 26 November 1989: President Ahmed Abdallah was overthrown by Said Mohamed Djohar and Bob Denard, resulting in his assassination; under French pressure, Denard and other mercenaries left the country the next month.

1990s 
 28 September 1995 (Operation Kaskari): President Said Mohamed Djohar was overthrown by Bob Denard, who returned to the country with a force of 33 hand-picked mercenaries; it was the last coup staged with Denard's involvement. The coup resulted in the French military intervention (Operation Azalee) days later, and the removal of Denard from the country.
 30 April 1999: President Tadjidine Ben Said Massounde was overthrown by Colonel Azali Assoumani of the Comorian Armed Forces.

2010s 
 20 April 2013: President Ikililou Dhoinine's government foiled a coup attempt.

See also 
 History of the Comoros

References 

Coups d'état
Coups d'état
Coups d'état
Comorian coups d'état
Comoros